Heliophanus butemboensis is a jumping spider species in the genus Heliophanus.  It was first described by Wanda Wesołowska in 1986 and is found in the Democratic Republic of the Congo and Rwanda.

References

Spiders described in 1986
Fauna of the Democratic Republic of the Congo
Arthropods of Rwanda
Salticidae
Spiders of Africa
Taxa named by Wanda Wesołowska